This is a listing of the ministers who served in Jerry Rawlings's National Democratic Congress government during the Fourth Republic of Ghana. This started on January 7, 1993, after 11 years of military rule by Rawlings. He retired from the Ghana Armed Forces and served a further two democratically elected terms ending January 7, 2001.

For Rawlings' first military government, see: Armed Forces Revolutionary Council.
For Rawlings' second military government, see: Provisional National Defence Council.

List of ministers

See also
National Democratic Congress

References

External links and sources
White House (Clinton era) on Ghana
List of Ministers of State 1999
NDC Ministers Previous Governmentp

History of Ghana
Politics of Ghana
Governments of Ghana
2001 in Ghana
1993 establishments in Ghana
2001 disestablishments in Ghana